William de Mohun of Dunster, Earl of Somerset (c. 1090 – c. 1155), 2nd feudal baron of Dunster, was a favourite of Empress Matilda and a loyal supporter of her in the war against King Stephen, during which he earned the epithet of the "Scourge of the West".

Life
William was the son of William de Moion, who was seigneur of Moyon which is close to Saint-Lô. The elder William was High Sheriff of Somerset in 1084.

During the war between Matilda and Stephen, Stephen marched against Mohun's castle at Dunster, but finding it too hard to take, he left Henry de Tracy to keep Mohun under siege.

Empress Matilda conferred upon him the title Earl of Somerset, in 1141. In the foundation charter of the priory at Bruton
, he describes himself as "Willielmus de Moyne, comes Somersetensis". 
Unlike Baldwin de Redvers who was created Earl of Devon by Matilda at around the same time, William's title was not recognised by Stephen or Henry II, Matilda's son, and his descendants did not use the title.

Family
William de Mohun, Earl of Somerset, married Agnes de Gaunt, daughter of Walter de Gaunt and Maud of Brittany, daughter of Stephen, Count of Tréguier, 3rd Lord of Richmond (born btw. 1058/62died 21 April 1136), (he is sometimes misidentified as "Stephen, Count of Brittany").

References

Sources

Ancestral Roots of Certain American Colonists Who Came to America Before 1700 by Frederick Lewis Weis; Line 143-24
G. E. C., ed. Geoffrey F. White. The Complete Peerage. (London: St. Chaterine Press, 1953) Vol. XII, Part 1, p. 36-38.
 

1090s births
1155 deaths
Earls of Somerset
Peers created by Empress Matilda